Doaktown Airport  is a privately owned airfield located  northeast of Doaktown, New Brunswick, Canada.

References

External links
Page about this airport on COPA's Places to Fly airport directory

Registered aerodromes in New Brunswick
Buildings and structures in Northumberland County, New Brunswick
Transport in Northumberland County, New Brunswick